Exchange Street Historic District is a national historic district located at Attica in Wyoming County, New York. The district encompasses 12 contributing buildings along two blocks in the village of Attica.  They are two- and three-story, brick and frame commercial buildings built after the fire of 1877.  The buildings provided service and hospitality for rail passengers and for cultural and social events for Attica's citizens.  They include the Williams Opera House (1879), Wyoming House (1878), Hotel Liberty or Attica Hotel (c. 1880), The Railroad Store (c. 1885), Erie House (1880), Spann Block (1874), Western Hotel (1832), and Erie Depot (1879).

It was listed on the National Register of Historic Places in 2012.

Gallery

References

Historic districts on the National Register of Historic Places in New York (state)
Historic districts in Wyoming County, New York
National Register of Historic Places in Wyoming County, New York